Kristin Meyer (born 27 June 1974 in Dortmund) is a German actress.

Career
Meyer studied acting and singing at the University of Music and Theatre Leipzig. From 2001 to 2005, she acted in several theaters in Germany, where she notably played classical leading roles such as Elisabeth in Shakespeare's Richard III.

From 2007 to 2010, she played the role of Iris Coster in the soap opera Gute Zeiten, schlechte Zeiten. She also played Romy in the series Ein Fall für Nadja.

She is married to film director, actor and dubbing actor . After staying in Saxony and Bavaria, she now lives in Berlin. 

Since 2010, Kristin Meyer has been supporting the orphanage St. Moses Children's Care Centre in Uganda.

During the 2017 German federal election campaign, Meyer endorsed the Social Democratic Party and its top candidate Martin Schulz.

Filmography
 2000: Polizeiruf 110 – Blutiges Eis (TV series)
 2000: Tatort – Quartett in Leipzig (TV series)
 2000: In aller Freundschaft (TV series)
 2001: Wolffs Revier (TV series)
 2006: Der Gast  (short film)
 2007: Ein Fall für Nadja (TV series)
 2007: Küstenwache (TV series)
 2007–2010: Gute Zeiten, schlechte Zeiten (TV series)
 2008: SOKO Wismar (TV series)
 2008: Hallo Robbie! (TV series)
 2010: Da kommt Kalle (TV series)
 2011: SOKO 5113 (TV series)
 2011: Leipzig Homicide (TV series)
 2012: Schloss Einstein (TV series)
 2012: Anna und die Liebe (TV series)
 2012: Nur wer die Sehnsucht kennt (short film)
 2012: Der Kriminalist (TV series)
 2014: Tatort – Winternebel
 seit 2014: Ein Fall von Liebe (TV series)
 2016–2017: Unter uns (TV series)
 2019: Zoo Doctor: My Mom the Vet (TV series)

References

External links

 
 Kristin Meyer's official website 

21st-century German actresses
German film actresses
German television actresses
German stage actresses
1974 births
Actors from Dortmund
Living people